Ethyl methanesulfonate (EMS) is a mutagenic, teratogenic, and carcinogenic organic compound with formula C3H8SO3.  It produces random mutations in genetic material by nucleotide substitution; particularly through G:C to A:T transitions induced by guanine alkylation. EMS typically produces only point mutations. Due to its potency and well understood mutational spectrum, EMS is the most commonly used chemical mutagen in experimental genetics. Mutations induced by EMS exposure can then be studied in genetic screens or other assays.

Use in biological research 
EMS can induce mutations at a rate of 5x10−4 to 5x10−2 per gene without substantial killing. A 5x10−4 per gene mutation rate observed in a typical EMS mutagenesis experiment of the model organism C. elegans, corresponds to a raw mutation rate of ~7x10−6 mutations per G/C base pair, or about 250 mutations within an originally mutagenized gamete (containing a ~100 Mbp, 36% GC haploid genome). Such a mutagenized gamete would have about 9 different loss-of-function mutations in genes, with 1 to 2 of these mutations being within essential genes and therefore lethal. However, since it is unlikely the same essential gene is mutated in independent gametes, and if loss of the essential gene did not kill the gamete itself, downstream gamete fusion often allows for survival of the resulting zygote and organism, as the now heterozygous non-functional mutated allele may be rescued by the still wildtype allele provided by the other gamete.

Mechanism of mutagenesis 
The ethyl group of EMS reacts with guanine in DNA, forming the abnormal base O6-ethylguanine. During DNA replication, DNA polymerases that catalyze the process frequently place thymine, instead of cytosine, opposite O6-ethylguanine. Following subsequent rounds of replication, the original G:C base pair can become an A:T pair (a transition mutation). This changes the genetic information, is often harmful to cells, and can result in disease. RNA polymerase can also place uridine (RNA analog of thymine) opposite an O6-ethylguanine lesion.

Repair of mutagenic lesion 
O6-ethylguanine can be repaired in vivo in a stoichiometric fashion by reacting with the active site cysteine of the O-6-methylguanine-DNA methyltransferase repair protein. The in vivo half-life of O6-ethylguanine was reported to be about 9 days in mouse brain, while it was about 1 day in mouse liver.

Induction of recombination

EMS induces mitotic recombination in Saccharomyces cerevisiae.  It was suggested that EMS damage to DNA may result in a repair process leading to genetic exchange.

Bacteriophage T4 mutants defective in any one of six genes known to be required for genetic recombination were found to be more sensitive to inactivation by EMS than wild type bacteriophage.  This finding suggests that a recombination process catalyzed by the proteins specified by these six genes is employed in repairing EMS lethal lesions in DNA.

Stability 
Generally speaking EMS is unstable in water, and undergoes hydrolysis to ethanol and methanesulfonic acid, however at neutral to acidic pH at room temperature, it has a fairly long half-life of over 1 day. Therefore, EMS must be specifically degraded before disposal. Protocols call for degradation of EMS in an equal volume of a 0.1M NaOH and 20% w/v sodium thiosulfate "inactivating solution", for at least six half-lives (>24 hours). The half-life of EMS in 1M NaOH is 6 hours at room temperature, while in a 10% w/v sodium thiosulfate solution it has a half-life of 1.4 hours.

See also
 Mutagenesis (molecular biology technique)
 MMS
 DMS
 ENU

References 

Ethylating agents
IARC Group 2B carcinogens
Mutagens
Teratogens
Ethyl esters
Mesylate esters